Service My Car is a UAE-based online car servicing and repair platform. The company is headquartered in Dubai, UAE and provides car services through its app in Saudi Arabia, Oman, UAE, and the UK.

The company also offers on-demand roadside assistance for car owners in the UAE.

History 
Service My Car was founded in 2018 by Ozair Puda after witnessing inefficiencies in the non-agency car servicing and repair market in the UAE. Puda, who currently serves as CEO of the company, worked in the automobile industry in the UK for several years before coming to the UAE to found the company.

In March 2021, the company raised $10 million in seed investment to expand the business in a round led by Omani business group Bahwan, one of the sultanate’s diversified family-owned groups.

In October 2021, Service My Car launched in Muscat, Oman. In January 2022, the company launched in Qatar, Saudi Arabia, India, and the United Kingdom. The company provides a contactless MOT test renewal service for car owners in the UK to get their registration renewed.

In June 2022, it was announced that Service My Car would become the new shirt sponsor of English football club Bolton Wanderers for the 2022-23 season.

In December 2022, the company launched servicemybike.com, which targets motorcycle users for servicing and repairs.

In January 2023, Service My Car announced it would be giving away 10 football tickets to watch a Bolton Wanderers match in VIP box seats at the University of Bolton Stadium.

References

Companies based in Dubai
2018 establishments in the United Arab Emirates
Online retailers of the United Arab Emirates